North Matewan is an unincorporated community in Mingo County, West Virginia, United States. North Matewan has a post office with ZIP code 25688.

References

Unincorporated communities in Mingo County, West Virginia
Unincorporated communities in West Virginia